Lala language may refer to:

Lala language (South Africa)
Lala-Bisa language (Zambia)
Lala language (Papua New Guinea)
Lala-Roba language (Nigeria)
Laalaa language of Senegal